Cheranmahadevi railway station belongs to the Madurai railway division and is present between Pudukudi Karaikurichi railway station and Melakallur. Daily 4 passenger trains from Tirunelveli (TEN) to Senkottai (SCT) and 4 passenger trains from Senkottai to Tirunelveli halt here. This railway station is useful for hamlets and villages like Kuniyur, Pattamadai, Melaseval

Services

References 

Madurai railway division
Railway stations in Tirunelveli district